"As We Know It" is the seventeenth episode of the second season of the American television medical drama Grey's Anatomy. The episode was written by Shonda Rhimes and was directed by Peter Horton. It originally aired on ABC on February 12, 2006. This episode is the second of a two-part story.

The episode (along with its first part, "It's the End of the World") secured writer Shonda Rhimes a 2006 Emmy Award nomination in the "Writing for a drama series" category.

Plot
Dr. Bailey is in labor, and without her husband Tucker Jones (who is undergoing neurosurgery) by her side, she refuses to push.  George works with Addison to convince Bailey to have the baby. He finally gets through to Bailey by giving her the motivation that she needs, and ultimately he holds her while she delivers the baby. Izzie and Alex have sex again. Chief Richard Webber is under a lot of stress from everything that's been going on, and it is believed that he is having a heart attack, which lures his wife Adele to the hospital. Dr. Bailey's husband goes into cardiac arrest. Meredith finally removes the explosive from the patient, and Dylan, the leader of the bomb squad, carries it away.  Meredith steps out of the operating room into the hallway, curiously watching Dylan walk away with the explosive, and at that moment, the bomb explodes, killing Dylan and a second bomb squad member.  Meredith is knocked unconscious by the explosion.  There is a revival of the "shower scene" from the first part, but with a more serious tone:  the fully clothed Izzie and Cristina wash blood off of a stunned Meredith as George looks on. Both Dr. Bailey's husband, and the man who had the explosive embedded in his body, survive.  At the end of the episode, Preston and Derek become friends, overcoming their initial rivalry in the series beginning, and call each other by their first names.  Cristina says "I love you, too" to a sleeping Preston. Derek comes to visit Meredith and says, "You almost died today," and Meredith tells him that she can't remember their last kiss. Derek recalls the kiss for her, telling her that she "smelled like some kind of flower," which Meredith says was lavender, and then he leaves.

Title reference
The episode's title refers to "It's the End of the World as We Know It (And I Feel Fine)" by R.E.M.

Music
"I Tell Myself" - Correatown
"Stay Where You Are" - Ambulance Ltd
"World Spins Madly On" - The Weepies
"Back in the Wild" - Los Chicros remixed by Greenskeepers
"Breathe (2 AM)" - Anna Nalick
"Unlike Me (A cappella version)" - Kate Havnevik
"Homebird" - Foy Vance

Reception

Dave Anderson of TV Guide liked the use of Anna Nalick's song in three key scenes. He called the scene where O'Malley convinces Bailey to go through with the birth "Knight's turn for Emmy consideration." Wetpaint named it in December 2011 one of the 5 best episodes of Grey's Anatomy along with the first part "It's the End of the World". Variety listed the episode in its top 10 most bizarre medical maladies encountered in the series.

Medical YouTuber Doctor Mike went over the two-parter highlighting all of the medical mistakes as well as the completely unrealistic actions of the bomb squad leader, calling him "the most useless bomb squad person ever".

References

External links
 

Grey's Anatomy (season 2) episodes
2006 American television episodes